The X Factor was an Australian television reality music competition, based on the original UK series, to find new singing talent; the winner of which received a management contract and a Sony Music Australia recording contract. The third season premiered on the Seven Network on 29 August 2011 and ended on 22 November 2011. The winner was Reece Mastin and his debut single "Good Night" was released after the final. Mastin was mentored throughout by Guy Sebastian, who won as mentor for the first time. There was only a one percent difference in the votes between Mastin and runner-up Andrew Wishart. The season was presented by Luke Jacobz. Ronan Keating and Sebastian were the only judges from the previous season who returned, while Natalie Bassingthwaighte and Mel B joined the judging panel as replacements for former judges, Natalie Imbruglia and Kyle Sandilands.

The competition was split into several stages: auditions, bootcamp, home visits and live shows. Auditions in front of the show's producers took place throughout March and April 2011. The successful auditionees chosen by the producers were then invited back to the last set of auditions that took place in front of the judges and a live studio audience during May and June. After the auditions was bootcamp, where successful acts were split into four categories: Boys, Girls, Over 25s and Groups. Each judge was given a category to mentor and had to decide on their twelve acts after day two, and their six acts after day three. Special guest judges, including Wynter Gordon, Stephen Belafonte, Darren Hayes and The Veronicas, were brought in to help the judges decide their acts. Following bootcamp was the home visits stage, where each of the judges reduced their six acts to three, with help from more guest judges including Beyoncé, Melanie C, Jason Derulo, Good Charlotte and Leona Lewis. The live shows began on 19 September 2011.

The season 3 sparked controversy, namely Mel B's attitude towards the other judges, labeling them dishonest and boring. Controversy also occurred between Sebastian and contestant Mitchell Callaway; Sebastian took aim at Callaway's attitude to the competition following his performance on the third live performance show. There were also claims of a clash between Callaway and contestant Declan Sykes. The grand final decider was watched by 1.99 million people, making it the highest rated television episode of the season.

Judges

On 16 March 2011, judge Kyle Sandilands announced on his breakfast radio show, Kyle & Jackie O that he would not be returning to the judging panel for season 3. Of his decision, Sandilands said, "Not because I didn't like it. I thought the show was great and it was great fun to do but it's just too hectic, it's too much work. So, I've told Channel Seven, no." On 31 March 2011, it was announced that Natalie Bassingthwaighte would join the judging panel as a replacement for Natalie Imbruglia. When speaking of her role as a judge, Bassingthwaighte said she would focus on bringing an honest critique to the show and would guide "the artists through the competition". In late April 2011, it was confirmed that Mel B would be Sandilands' replacement. Mel B said, "[The contestants] are either going to love me or hate me but it's going to be a fun ride. I'm really easy to get on with and I'm a hard worker. I'm firm but nice." Guy Sebastian and Ronan Keating were the only judges from the season 2 who returned.

Selection process

Auditions
In 2011, the minimum age for contestants to audition was changed to 14 years old, having previously been 16 years old. Auditions in front of the show's producers began in March 2011 in five cities: Perth (Parmelia Hilton, 27 March), Adelaide (AAMI Stadium, 29 March), Brisbane (Gold Coast Convention and Exhibition Centre, 2–3 April), Sydney (Australian Technology Park, 8–10 April) and Melbourne (Moonee Valley Racecourse, 15–17 April). The successful auditionees chosen by the producers were then invited back to the last set of auditions that took place in front of the judges and a live studio audience. These auditions were held in three cities: Brisbane (Brisbane Entertainment Centre, 21–22 May), Melbourne (Hisense Arena, 27–29 May), and Sydney (Sydney Entertainment Centre, 2–3 June).

Bootcamp
The bootcamp stage was held in Sydney and was first broadcast on 7 September 2011. On the first day of bootcamp, each judge was given a category to mentor and were joined by a celebrity guest judge to help them decide their top twelve acts. Sebastian was assisted by Wynter Gordon and was given the Boys, Mel B was assisted by her husband Stephen Belafonte and was given the Girls, Bassingthwaighte teamed up with Darren Hayes and was assigned the Over 25s, and Keating was assisted by The Veronicas and had the Groups. On the second day, the Boys each had to sing a song made famously by a female artist, the Over 25s got styled for a photo shoot and later each had to perform one song, the Girls had to perform choreography to either Adele's "Rolling in the Deep" or Lady Gaga's "Born This Way", and the Groups held recording sessions with vocal producer Erana Clark. On the third day of bootcamp, the judges along with their celebrity guest judges, narrowed down the contestants to six each.

The 24 successful acts were:
Boys: Rob Baron, Trent Bell, Reece Mastin, Johnny Ruffo, Declan Sykes, Mali Talefenua
Girls: Tyla Bertolli, Sophie Metcalfe (replaced Tara-Lynn Sharrock due to Visa issues), Chantelle Morrell, Jacqui Newland, Christina Parie, Amy Walton
Over 25s: Mitchell Callaway, Pamela Cook, Marina Davis, Cleo Howman, Paige Phoenix, Andrew Wishart
Groups: Audio Vixen, Femme Da Funk, Hype (previously known as Lazy J & Big Guy), Three Wishez, Up Front, Young Men Society

Home visits
The final round of the selection process, the home visits (formerly the "judges' houses"), saw the judges reduce their six acts to three. Each judge took their six acts to exclusive locations around the world. Sebastian and the Boys travelled to New York City, where he was assisted by Beyoncé and her A-Team, Mel B and the Girls visited Hollywood, where they met up with Melanie C, Bassingthwaighte and the Over 25s travelled to Double Island, Queensland, where she was helped by Jason Derulo, and Keating and the Groups travelled to Los Angeles, California, where they were assisted by Good Charlotte and Leona Lewis,. After, the judges along with their celebrity guest judges, narrowed down the contestants to three each.

Acts 

Key:
 – Winner
 – Runner-up

Live shows

Results summary
Act's colour key:

 Act in Team Mel B
 Act in Team Guy
 Act in Team Natalie Bassingthwaighte
 Act in Team Ronan

  – Act in the bottom two and had to perform again in the final showdown
  – Act received the fewest public votes and was immediately eliminated (no final showdown)

Live show details

Week 1 (19/20 September)
Theme: Judges' Choice
Celebrity performers: Bryan Adams ("When You're Gone") and Jack Vidgen (Medley: "Who's Lovin' You"/"Think")
Group performance: "Raise Your Glass"

Judges' vote to eliminate
Sebastian: Cleo Howman – based on the final showdown performance.
Mel B: Cleo Howman – backed her own act, Jacqui Newland, though stated she did not like Howman since the start of the competition.
Bassingthwaighte: Jacqui Newland – backed her own act, Cleo Howman.
Keating: Cleo Howman – was impressed by Newland's passion during the final showdown.

Notes
On the live performance show, the judges opened the show to perform their own hits together. Sebastian performed first on the piano, singing "Who's That Girl", followed by Bassingthwaighte's "Someday Soon". Keating then sang "Lovin' Each Day" and Mel B took the stage last to perform Spice Girls' "Who Do You Think You Are".

Week 2 (27/28 September)
Theme: Party Anthems
Celebrity performers: Kelly Clarkson ("Mr. Know It All") and Sneaky Sound System ("Big")
Group performance: "Party Rock Anthem" with LMFAO

Judges' vote to eliminate

Sebastian: Tyla Bertolli – went with his gut.
Bassingthwaighte: Tyla Bertolli – based on the final showdown performance.
Keating: Jacqui Newland – said that Bertolli had improved more.
Mel B: Tyla Bertolli – said that Newland controlled her nerves better.

Notes
This week's shows were aired on Tuesday and Wednesday nights due to the Seven Network televising the 2011 Brownlow Medal.
The songs that the contestants sang in the live performance show were chosen by the Australian public.
Sebastian was absent on the live results show, but present through live telecast, thus eligible to vote.

Week 3 (3/4 October)
Theme: Rock
Mentor: Alice Cooper
Celebrity performers:  Natalie Bassingthwaighte ("All We Have") and Simple Plan ("Can't Keep My Hands Off You")
Group performance: "Live and Let Die"

Judges' vote to eliminate

Keating: Jacqui Newland – backed his own act, Young Men Society.
Mel B: Young Men Society – backed her own act, Jacqui Newland.
Bassingthwaighte: Jacqui Newland – because it was Newland's third consecutive time in the bottom two.
Sebastian: Jacqui Newland – said that Newland had been in the final showdown three weeks in a row whereas Young Men Society had more to give.

Week 4 (10/11 October)
Theme: The 90s
Celebrity performers: Vanessa Amorosi ("Amazing") and Chris Isaak ("Oh, Pretty Woman")
Group performance: "Hold On"

Judges' vote to eliminate

Keating: Johnny Ruffo – backed his own act, Audio Vixen.
Sebastian: Audio Vixen – backed his own act, Johnny Ruffo.
Bassingthwaighte: Johnny Ruffo – felt that Audio Vixen has improved more.
Mel B: Audio Vixen – could not decide and sent the result to deadlock.

With the acts in the bottom two receiving two votes each, the result went to deadlock and reverted to the earlier public vote. Audio Vixen were eliminated as the act with the fewest public votes.

Week 5 (17/18 October)
Theme: Number-one hits
Celebrity performers: Altiyan Childs ("Ordinary Man") and Jason Derülo (Medley: "It Girl"/"Don't Wanna Go Home")
Group performance: Michael Jackson medley with Jason Derülo

Judges' vote to eliminate

Keating: Declan Sykes – backed his own act, Young Men Society.
Sebastian: Young Men Society – backed his own act, Declan Sykes.
Mel B: Declan Sykes – based her decision on who would be more favourable internationally.
Bassingthwaighte: Young Men Society – sent the result to deadlock since it was Young Men Society's second time in the bottom two and Sykes' first.
 
With the acts in the bottom two receiving two votes each, the result was deadlock and reverted to the earlier public vote. Young Men Society were eliminated as the act with the fewest public votes.

Week 6 (24/25 October)
Theme: Australian hits
Celebrity performers: Aloe Blacc ("I Need a Dollar") and Darren Hayes ("Bloodstained Heart")
Group performance: Savage Garden medley with Darren Hayes

Judges' vote to eliminate

Sebastian: Mitchell Callaway – backed his own act, Johnny Ruffo.
Bassingthwaighte: Johnny Ruffo – backed her own act, Mitchell Callaway.
Mel B: Mitchell Callaway – said Ruffo was the most improved since the first week.
Keating: Johnny Ruffo – telling that Callaway has been trying more hard that week.

With the acts in the bottom two receiving two votes each, the result went to deadlock and reverted to the earlier public vote. Callaway was eliminated as the act with the fewest public votes.

Week 7 (31 October/1 November)
Theme: Dance
Celebrity performers: Ronan Keating ("Arthur's Theme (Best That You Can Do)") and Jessica Mauboy featuring Stan Walker ("Galaxy")
Group performance: "We Run the Night"/"Get It" with Havana Brown

Judges' vote to eliminate

Mel B: Reece Mastin – backed her own act, Christina Parie.
Sebastian: Christina Parie – backed his own act, Reece Mastin.
Keating: Christina Parie – stated that Mastin has improved more.
Bassingthwaighte: Christina Parie – chose to eliminate Parie to "stay true to [her]self".

Week 8: Quarter-Final (7/8 November)
Theme: Legends
Celebrity performers: Ricki-Lee ("Raining Diamonds") and Susan Boyle ("Autumn Leaves")
Group performance: "How Can We Be Lovers?" with Michael Bolton

Judges' vote to eliminate

Keating: Declan Sykes – backed his own act, Three Wishez.
Sebastian: Three Wishez – backed his own act, Declan Sykes.
Bassingthwaighte: Declan Sykes – stated that Three Wishez improved more.
Mel B: Declan Sykes – stated that Three Wishez could go further in the competition.

Week 9: Semi-Final (14/15 November)
Theme: Pleasure and Pain
Mentor: Stevie Nicks 
Celebrity performers: Florence and the Machine ("Shake It Out"), Ed Sheeran ("The A Team") and Stevie Nicks ("Secret Love")
Group performance: Fleetwood Mac medley

Notes
For the first time this season, each act performed two songs – one uplifting and one emotional.
Also for the first time, there was no final showdown and the act that received the fewest public votes was immediately eliminated.

Week 10: Final (21/22 November)
21 November
Theme: No theme (songs from the auditions and live shows that the mentor believes will show their true talent); superstar duets
Superstar duet performers:
The Fray with Andrew Wishart
Salt-n-Pepa with Johnny Ruffo
Kylie Minogue with Reece Mastin
Group performance: "Can't Get You Out of My Head"/"Better the Devil You Know"/"All the Lovers" with Kylie Minogue

Johnny Ruffo received the fewest public votes and was automatically eliminated.

22 November
Guest performers: The Fray ("Heartbeat"), Luke O'Dell ("Introvert Extrovert"), Guy Sebastian ("Don't Worry Be Happy") and Kylie Minogue ("I Should Be So Lucky")
Group Performances:
"I Like How It Feels" (performed by top three finalists)
"Imagine" with Emmanuel Kelly (performed with top 12 finalists)

Reception

Controversy
Three days before the season's premiere, Mel B made comments about the other judges, labelling them dishonest and boring. She said, "I don't care much for the other judges ... Ronan thinks he knows it all [and] Natalie is just too nice and really dishonest. Guy could just be boring, like 'get on with it. Keep it moving, brother.'" During a radio interview with The Kyle and Jackie O Show on 29 August 2011, Bassingthwaighte responded to Mel B's comments saying, "I think it's in fun – I hope so otherwise she deserves a slap." Mel B appeared on the same radio show the following day and said, "They're all scared of me and I love it, there's got to be one bitch on the show so I might as well take that bloody crown."

More controversy occurred after Sebastian took aim at contestant Mitchell Callaway's attitude to the competition following his performance of "Run to Paradise" on the third live performance show. Sebastian told Callaway: "You've got to have the right attitude to this competition, you've got to be focused and to be honest, not be rude to people and have the work ethic. For you to not learn your lyrics and for you to at times be rude to crew, you really have to pull that in and rein that in because you won't last long in this competition or this industry if you do that." The following morning, Callaway's mentor Bassingthwaighte spoke to radio station 2Day FM about the issue:

"It makes me feel sick actually, I feel sick in the stomach ... I feel Mitchell did the best performance that he's done so far, I think Guy made the mistake of commenting on stuff that didn't happen on camera. He said he's rude to crew and needs to check his behaviour ... When he [Mitchell] got off stage he said, 'I'm not coming back'."

However, later that same day, Callaway tweeted, "I'm not gunna quit guys ... It's not the Aussie way. I'm not gunna let al u beautiful ppl dwn. Or Natalie after everythyng she's done." On the third live results show, Sebastian apologised to Callaway and said he "chose the wrong time and place to say it". The Seven Network insiders revealed that a clash between Callaway and another contestant, Declan Sykes, was the real reason behind Sebastian's on-air rebuke. Sykes, who battles Asperger syndrome, reportedly took offence at being pricked with a pin by Callaway.

Contestants
Contestant Emmanuel Kelly appeared on the first episode of the season's audition show on 29 August 2011, and performed a rendition of John Lennon's "Imagine". His performance earned a standing ovation from the judges and the audience. Keating was full of praise for Kelly, who then moved into the next round of competition. Keating told Kelly: "I don't think I've ever been moved as I was by that performance." Kelly and his brother Ahmed were adopted by Children First Foundation boss, Moira Kelly, who is also the guardian of the once-conjoined Bangladesh twins, Krishna and Trishna. Kelly and his brother came from Iraq, where they were abandoned at an orphanage and both suffered limb deficiencies as a result of chemical warfare. During the third day of bootcamp, Sebastian eliminated Kelly from the competition, disappointed that he had forgotten words to his song the day before. Emmanuel Kelly appeared and gave an inspirational performance (speech and song) at the UN Youth Dialogue on 30 May 2018.

Another contestant, Luke O'Dell, appeared on the third audition show on 31 August. After failing to impress the judges with his rendition of Kelly Clarkson's "Since U Been Gone", O'Dell then sang an original song he wrote titled, "Introvert Extrovert", which made him an overnight internet sensation. The song entered the iTunes' Top 100 chart overnight and landed O'Dell thousands of fans on social media and his official YouTube channel. The song title also became a worldwide trending topic on Twitter for more than two hours, following his television performance of the song. Overnight commentary on Twitter and Facebook quickly labelled O'Dell as the Australian version of Rebecca Black, who found fame with her song, "Friday". However, O'Dell failed to move through to the next round of the competition. Both Kelly and O'Dell returned to perform on the live grand final decider show.

Ratings
The premiere episode on 29 August 2011 topped the night's overall ratings with 1,319,000 viewers, compared to the 1,186,000 viewers who tuned in to watch the premiere episode of the second season. All six of the audition episodes ranked first on their respective nights and peaked the highest the following night with an audience of 1,690,000 viewers. The first live performance show on 19 September 2011, gained 1,452,000 viewers and topped the night's overall ratings. The live grand final decider show on 22 November 2011, was the highest rated episode of the third season with 1,998,000 viewers.

 Colour key:
  – Highest rating during the season
  – Lowest rating during the season

References

External links
 The X Factor at Yahoo!7

Season 3
2011 Australian television seasons
Australia 03